Frederick William Danker (July 12, 1920 – February 2, 2012) was a Christ Seminary–Seminex Professor Emeritus of New Testament at the Lutheran School of Theology at Chicago, Illinois. Danker was a noted New Testament scholar and the pre-eminent Koine Greek lexicographer for two generations, working with F. Wilbur Gingrich as an editor of the Bauer Lexicon starting in 1957 until the publication of the second edition in 1979, and as the only editor from 1979 until the publication of the 3rd edition, updating it with the results of modern scholarship, converting it to SGML to allow it to be easily published in electronic formats, and significantly improving the usability of the lexicon, as well as the typography.

Earlier English-language editions of the Bauer Lexicon were essentially translations and adaptations of Walter Bauer's German dictionary into English. Danker’s dictionary was essentially an entirely new work. He reportedly worked on the lexicon 12 hours a day, 6 days a week, for 10 years.

Career

Professor Danker received his formal training at Concordia Seminary, where he satisfied requirements for a B.D. degree with a dissertation on the function of the Hebrew word הֶבֶל (hebel) within the book of Qoheleth. He then undertook his PhD studies at the University of Chicago, Department of Humanities, in classical studies, with special interest in Homer, Pindar, and the Greek tragedians, finally writing a dissertation on "Threnetic Penetration in Aeschylus and Sophocles".

From 1954 on, Danker taught at the Lutheran Church–Missouri Synod's Concordia Seminary in St. Louis, when he joined the team of Arndt and Gingrich and helped produce the second edition of BAG, then called BAGD. In 1974, he left with the majority of faculty members to form Concordia Seminary in Exile, also known as Seminex. On the voluntary dissolution of Seminex in 1983, Danker chose to go to the Lutheran School of Theology at Chicago, where he taught until his retirement in 1988. He then began his magisterial work on the BDAG, upon which completion the lexicon was finally released in 2000.

Having already produced BDAG (3rd ed) during his so-called "retirement", he spent his last years preparing The Concise Greek-English Lexicon of the New Testament which is not a condensation of BDAG but an entirely new, although shorter, lexicon of the New Testament.

Awards and recognition

In 2004, a festschrift with the title Biblical Greek Language and Lexicography: Essays in Honor of Frederick W. Danker was published to celebrate Danker's work, including 18 essays on biblical Greek language and lexicography.

Personal reflection

"In a personal interview I conducted with him in January, 2003, I asked Prof Danker about his own education at Concordia Seminary, where William Arndt was his professor. He told me of a course where they translated the entire NT in two semesters! He described also his Ph.D. in Classics at the University of Chicago and his return to teach at Concordia, where he stayed until the seminary divided in the seventies when he went to Seminex and then to the Lutheran School of Theology in Chicago. I asked Professor Danker if he could confirm the rumor circulating about him “on the street.” That of course  his interest, and he responded: “Oh, what is that?” I told him that there was a rumor that he had worked continuously on the 3rd edition of the lexicon for twelve hours each day, six days a week, for ten years. I should not have been surprised that his humble response was simply, “Well, we did take vacations." It is a memory that I will always cherish and I tell my students about it often. He also whispered to me that he had another project in the works. When his 400-page Concise Greek-English Lexicon of the New Testament appeared in 2009, I recalled that “can you keep a secret?” remark! Frederick W Danker was a pains-taking scholar, the likes of which the Christian world has rarely seen. But I close with something else that I learned about the man that day. He apologized that he had to end the interview because he wanted to pay a pastoral visit in the hospital to an ailing colleague." (William Varner)

Frederick W. Danker Depositorium

The Frederick W. Danker Depositorium is located within the Overton Memorial Library on the campus of Heritage Christian University in Florence, Alabama. In April 2010, Danker informed the staff of the Overton Memorial Library that he would be giving his entire personal library and papers to OML. The process officially began in October 2010 and continued until shortly after his death in February 2012. Housed within the Danker Depositorium are files of research conducted by Danker, personal correspondence, published and unpublished writings by Danker. and memorabilia from his home and office.

Works

 A Greek-English Lexicon of the New Testament and Other Early Christian Literature. 3d ed. University of Chicago Press. .
 The Concise Greek-English Lexicon of the New Testament .
 2 Corinthians - Augsburg Commentary on the New Testament .
 Benefactor: Epigraphic Study of a Graeco-Roman and New Testament Semantic Field .
 A Century of Greco-Roman Philology Featuring the American Philological Association and the Society of Biblical Literature .
 Creeds in the Bible (Biblical monographs) ASIN: B0006BOYBE.
 Invitation to the New Testament Epistles IV: A commentary on Hebrews, James, 1 and 2 Peter, 1, 2.
 Multipurpose Tools for Bible Study .
 Jesus and the New Age: A commentary on St. Luke's Gospel .

References

Sources 
 
 Rykle Borger, Remarks of an Outsider about Bauer's Wörterbuch, BAGD, BDAG, and Their Textual Basis, pp. 32–47, Biblical Greek language and lexicography: essays in honor of Frederick W. Danker, ed. Bernard A. Taylor (et al.). Grand Rapids: Wm. B. Eerdmans Publishing. .

External links

Biblical Greek Language and Lexicography: Essays in Honor of Frederick W. Danker. Review by Edgar Krentz.
Review of BDAG Lexicon by Rodney J. Decker
Leading New Testament Greek scholar donates extensive library to Heritage Christian University
Expanding a Heritage
Tribute to Frederick Danker by Rodney J. Decker
Lutheran School of Theology at Chicago News Release: "Frederick W. Danker, professor emeritus of New Testament, dies"
"Rev. Frederick William Danker dies, renowned Bible scholar taught and was fired in purge at Concordia Seminary". St. Louis Today

1920 births
2012 deaths
American male non-fiction writers
American lexicographers
20th-century American Lutheran clergy
Lutheran School of Theology at Chicago faculty
People from Frankenmuth, Michigan
Clergy from St. Louis
University of Chicago alumni
Lutheran Church–Missouri Synod people
Concordia Seminary alumni